The following is a list of team records and statistics from those that have made appearances in the National Collegiate Women's Ice Hockey Championship. The championship has existed since the 2000–2001 season and groups include the university teams of Divisions I and II of the NCAA. These statistics are updated through the 2016 tournament.

Tournament format history
2001–2004
 4 teams (single-elimination)

2005–2021
 8 teams (single-elimination)

2022–Present
 11 teams (single-elimination)

Most Championships Won By State
The following list is of championships won ranked by state.

Consolation game discontinued after 2005.

Championships by conference

References

External links
  NCAA Division I women ice hockey page
 NCAA Ice Hockey, Division I Women's Records

 
College women's ice hockey in the United States